Gray Line Montreal, although a member of the Coach Canada family, is an independently managed operation, that also formerly carried the brand of Stagecoach Montréal. They run a fleet of coaches and double-decker buses in and around Montreal, under the banner of Gray Line Worldwide sightseeing tours, offering city tours and trips to Quebec City. Although departures are mostly at the Dorchester Square/Peel Street location, some of the routes offer hop-on hop-off convenience.

History 
Autocar Connaiseur was founded in 1982 by Lorenzo Calce, a former vice-president of Murray Hill Limousines, operating charters and Gray Line sightseeing tours in Montreal. In 1997 the company, which had grown to a fleet of over 100 buses, was sold to Coach USA the North American division of Stagecoach. Approval under the Investment Canada Act was given in October 1999, for Stagecoach to acquire Autocar Connaisseur of Montréal.

The parent of each of the Connaisseur Group of companies is 3329003 Canada a non-carrier owned by Coach USA. Gray Line Montreal was included in the April 2019 disposal by Stagecoach of its North American operations to Variant Equity Advisors.

References

Bus transport in Quebec
Gray Line Worldwide
Companies based in Montreal
Transport companies established in 1982
Stagecoach Group bus operators in the United States and Canada
Transport in Montreal
1982 establishments in Quebec